The Long Day Closes is a 1992 British film written and directed by Terence Davies. It stars Marjorie Yates, Leigh McCormack and Anthony Watson. It was entered into the 1992 Cannes Film Festival.

Plot
The film is set in Liverpool in the mid-1950s. The story concerns a shy twelve-year-old boy, Bud, and his loving mother and siblings. He lives a life rich in imagination, centred on family relationships, church, and his struggles at school. Music and snatches of movie dialogue allow him to enrich his narrow physical environment. "Together these fragments", wrote Stephen Holden in The New York Times, "evoke a postwar England starved for beauty, fantasy and a place to escape."

Cast
 Marjorie Yates as Mother
 Leigh McCormack as Bud
 Anthony Watson as Kevin
 Nicholas Lamont as John
 Ayse Owens as Helen
 Tina Malone as Edna
 Jimmy Wilde as Curly
 Robin Polley as Mr. Nicholls
 Pete Ivatts as Mr. Bushell
 Joy Blakeman as Frances
 Denise Thomas as Jean
 Patricia Morrison as Amy
 Gavin Mawdslay as Billy
 Kirk McLaughlin as Labourer / Christ
 Mark Heath as Black Man

Music
The film uses 35 pieces of music, including renditions of songs by Nat King Cole.

Critic David Thomson in his April 2007 review of the film in the British Film Institute's Sight & Sound magazine draws attention to the music that was used in the film, in particular "at the end of the film ... that mackerel sky and Sir Arthur Sullivan's 'The Long Day Closes' itself" sung by Pro Cantione Antiqua.

Production
The film was filmed in sets built in Rotherhithe London at Sands Films Studio under the meticulous instructions of the director.

Reception
On the review aggregator website Rotten Tomatoes, the film has an 81% approval rating based on reviews from 21 critics, with an average rating of 7.60 out of 10. On Metacritic, the film received a weighted average score of 85/100 based on 15 critics, indicating "universal acclaim".

A 2009 appreciation by Dennis Lim said:

"Together these fragments", wrote Stephen Holden in The New York Times, "evoke a postwar England starved for beauty, fantasy and a place to escape...The Long Day Closes is filled with surreal, expressionistic touches that lend it the aura of a phantasmagoric cinematic poem."

On IndieWire's 2022 'The 100 Best Movies of the 90s' list, the film was crowned the ninth best film of its decade. Critic David Ehrlich writes "Davies’ fading slipstream of a film drifts through the rain and rubble of postwar England with the meticulousness of a Wes Anderson movie, eventually freezing over into a delicate snow-globe that swirls the pain of repression into the pleasure of self-discovery."

Awards and nominations

References

External links

The Long Day Closes: In His Own Good Time an essay by Michael Koresky at the Criterion Collection

1992 films
1992 drama films
Films set in Liverpool
LGBT culture in Liverpool
Films directed by Terence Davies
British drama films
1990s English-language films
1990s British films